Area code 345 is the local telephone area code of the Cayman Islands.  The 345 area code was created during a split from the original 809 area code which began permissive dialing on 1 September 1996 and ended 31 August 1997.

When in the Cayman Islands, the seven digits are used alone. When calling to Cayman Islands from anywhere in the United States or Canada  1(345) is dialed along with the other seven digits of the phone number.

Prior to splitting from 809, the Cayman Islands numbers all began with 94, and five-digit dialing was possible using only the digits that followed 94.

See also
List of NANP area codes
North American Numbering Plan
Area codes in the Caribbean
Telephone numbers in the United Kingdom

External links
North American Numbering Plan Administrator
 List of exchanges from AreaCodeDownload.com, 345 Area Code

345
Communications in the Cayman Islands